Kgosietsile King Ndlovu (born 20 March 1993) is a South African soccer player who plays as a goalkeeper for South African Premier Division side Maritzburg United.

Career
Born in Ga-Rankuwa, Ndlovu played youth football for SuperSport United, before becoming professional in 2014. As a professional, Ndlovu has played for Roses United, FC Cape Town, Jomo Cosmos and Black Leopards.

References

1993 births
Living people
People from Ga-Rankuwa
Soccer players from Gauteng
South African soccer players
Association football goalkeepers
Roses United F.C. players
F.C. Cape Town players
Jomo Cosmos F.C. players
Black Leopards F.C. players
Marumo Gallants F.C. players
Maritzburg United F.C. players
South African Premier Division players
National First Division players